Willie Meyer  (born 6 November 1967) is a South African former rugby union player.

Playing career
Meyer represented  schools at the annual Craven Week tournaments in 1984 and 1985.

Meyer was selected as part of the end of year touring party to Italy and England in 1995, and sat on the bench for both tests. He played his first test match for the Springboks against  on 6 December 1997 at Murrayfield in Edinburgh. His next Test match was in 1999 and he played in three Tests during the year. However, Meyer was a regular member of the Springbok team from 2000 and played 22 Tests from 2000 to 2002. He also played in five tour matches, scoring one try for the Springboks.

Test history

See also
List of South Africa national rugby union players – Springbok no. 663

References

1967 births
Living people
South African rugby union players
South Africa international rugby union players
Eastern Province Elephants players
Free State Cheetahs players
Golden Lions players
Lions (United Rugby Championship) players
Rugby union props
Rugby union players from Port Elizabeth